Call of Duty: Warzone is a free-to-play battle royale video game released on March 10, 2020, for PlayStation 4, Windows, and Xbox One. The game is a part of 2019's Call of Duty: Modern Warfare and is connected to 2020's Call of Duty: Black Ops: Cold War and 2021's Call of Duty: Vanguard, but does not require purchase of any of the aforementioned titles, and was introduced during Season 2 of Modern Warfare content. Warzone was developed by Infinity Ward and Raven Software (the latter later credited as the sole developer following the integration of Cold Wars content) and published by Activision. Warzone allows online multiplayer combat among 150 players, although some limited-time game modes support 200 players. The game features both cross-platform play and cross-platform progression between the three aforementioned titles.

At launch, the game features two main modes: Battle Royale and Plunder. Warzone introduces a new in-game currency system that can be used at "Buy Stations" in and around the map. "Loadout" drops are an example of where Cash can be traded for limited access to players' custom classes (which were shared with Modern Warfares standard modes prior to Season 6, v1.29, but now are unique to Warzone). Players may also use Cash to purchase items such as "killstreaks" and gas masks. Cash can be found by looting buildings and killing players that have cash on them. At launch, Warzone only offered Trios, a squad capacity of three players. However, in free post-launch content updates, Solos, Duos and Quads have all been added to the game.

The game received generally favorable reviews from critics. In April 2021, Activision announced that Warzone had surpassed 100 million active players. A sequel, titled Call of Duty: Warzone 2.0, was released on November 16, 2022, as a free-to-play component of Call of Duty: Modern Warfare II, while a mobile version of Warzone is also in development.

Gameplay

Game modes 
Warzone is the second main battle royale installment in the Call of Duty franchise, following the "Blackout" mode of Call of Duty: Black Ops 4 (2018). ‘‘Warzone’’ differs from Black Ops 4 by reducing reliance on equipable gadgets and instead encouraging the accumulation of a new in-game currency called Cash. At launch, Warzone features two primary game modes: Battle Royale and Plunder,. It supports up to 150 players in a single match, which exceeds the typical size of 100 players seen in other battle royale titles. Some limited-time modes support 200 players.

The Battle Royale mode is similar to other titles in the genre where players compete in a continuously shrinking map to be the last player remaining. Players parachute onto a large game map, where they encounter other players. As the game progresses and players are eliminated, the playable area shrinks, forcing the remaining players into tighter spaces. In Warzone, the non-playable areas become contaminated with a yellow gas that depletes health and eventually kills the player if they do not return to the safe playable area. Unlike other titles, Warzone introduces a greater emphasis on vehicles, and a new in-game currency mechanic. Parachuting is unrestricted, with the player being allowed to open and cut their parachute an unlimited number of times while in air. At launch, the game supported trios (squads of up to three players) with an option to disable squad filling. Four-player squads and Solo BR modes were added in following updates, while Duos was added near the end of Modern Warfare Season 3.

Character death in Battle Royale does not necessarily translate to player defeat like in other titles. Instead, the mode offers a respawn mechanic which players can take advantage of in various ways. Players who are killed are transported to the "Gulag", where they engage in one-on-one combat with another defeated player, with both players being given the same weaponry. The guns that the players receive have few or no attachments. Players may only enter the gulag after their first death in a match. The winner of this combat is respawned into the game. Other methods of respawn are available using the in-game currency system. Players may use the in-game currency to purchase respawn tokens for other players should they not be revived by the Gulag mechanic.

In-match events can occur at any time, and consist of Jailbreak, Fire Sale, and Supply Chopper.
 Jailbreak frees all players in the Gulag and returns them to the match.
 Fire Sale discounts all purchases at Buy Stations up to 80%.
 Supply Chopper spawns a helicopter carrying loot that drops once shot down.

In the Plunder mode, teams have to search for stacks of Cash scattered around the map to accumulate $1 million. Once found or if time is almost up, the game goes into overtime, multiplying all Cash sums by 1.5. The team who has gathered the most money when the clock runs out is declared the winner. Players respawn automatically in this gamemode.

Resurgence mode, introduced with Rebirth Island and primarily featured as its main game mode, plays similarly to Battle Royale; however, upon death, players are respawned into the match as long as there is at least one squadmate alive in their team. If the entire squad is wiped, they are eliminated from the match. In solo modes, each player is given a respawn timer to wait out before they can respawn again. The Gulag is not employed in Resurgence modes.

In addition to Battle Royale, Plunder and Resurgence, several limited-time modes have been introduced throughout the course of the game's life cycle, both recurring modes and one-time game modes. Warzone has also been used to reveal upcoming Call of Duty titles through similar limited-time gamemodes.

Maps

Verdansk / Verdansk '84 
Verdansk was the original Battle Royale map featured in Warzone for the Modern Warfare content seasons and seasons 1 and 2 of Black Ops Cold War. It was themed after the fictional city shown in Modern Warfare's campaign and multiplayer modes. It is divided into five main sectors that are further divided into zones, each with a unique point of interest. The map is based on the real-life Donetsk city.

Verdansk '84 was an updated version of the Verdansk map, featured in the game's Battle Royale and Plunder modes for the Black Ops Cold War content seasons and released alongside the Season 3 content update in April 2021. It was unveiled after the nuclear destruction of its modern-day counterpart, taking place in the spring of 1984. The majority of structures and locations were rethemed and revisited, along with global touch-ups across the entire map. The map featured seven new locations, five revamped locations, the removal of several structures and obstacles, and the addition of a new centerpiece, the Grid Radar Array.  Several new locations and points of interest were added as the Cold War and Warzone integrated seasons progressed. These included Nakatomi Plaza, survival camps, CIA outpost, several satellite crash sites, and Red Doors. Also featured were new global weapon loadout changes from Modern Warfare to Cold War, with weapons from the former still being accessible via Loadout Drops.

Rebirth Island 
Rebirth Island was the second map introduced in the game with the integration of Black Ops Cold War's contents. The map was based on the real-life Vozrozhdeniya Island, which was also featured in the Call of Duty: Black Ops campaign mode. Design-wise, the map is a re-imagination of "Alcatraz Island", previously featured in Black Ops 4's Blackout mode. Unlike Verdansk, Rebirth Island is smaller in scale, only allowing 40 players maximum per match. Alongside the release of Season 2 Reloaded for Vanguard in March 2022, Rebirth Island Reinforced, an updated version of the original map, was released, featuring two new points of interest, Stronghold and Docks, and various cosmetic tweaks.

Caldera 
First teased during the Multiplayer reveal of Call of Duty: Vanguard, Caldera is a World War II-themed island map released with the Season 1 content update for Vanguard in December 2021 with mixed reception. It replaces Verdansk as the primary map for Battle Royale and Plunder modes, and is characterized by dense forests, caves, and large water-based areas. Caldera remains as the only playable map in Warzone following the release of Call of Duty: Warzone 2.0.

Fortune's Keep 
Fortune's Keep was a small-sized island map introduced with Vanguard season 4. The map takes place in a Mediterranean setting, with seaside town areas and coves, in addition to water-based areas similar to Caldera.

Equipment 
In Battle Royale and Resurgence modes, every player starts out with a basic un-customized pistol. Players can pick up every component found in a standard loadout (primary and secondary weapons, lethal and tactical equipment, field upgrades, and kill streaks) as they search the map for items scattered across the ground and from supply boxes found in designated locations. Additional equipment unique to ‘‘Warzone’’ are armor plates. Three of these armor plates can be equipped to a player at a given time with the ability to carry up to five plates in the players' inventory, or up to eight if the player has found an armor satchel. Players can also pick up cash that can be used at buy stations to purchase various killstreaks or support items. Custom weapon loadouts can be acquired from loadout crates. These loadout crates appear periodically throughout a match and can also be purchased from buy stations. In Plunder, players spawn with custom loadouts, similar to regular Multiplayer modes.

For the release of Call of Duty: Black Ops Cold War, Activision and Treyarch announced that the game would feature a unified progression system with Warzone, allowing items from Cold War multiplayer modes to be usable within Warzone, alongside Modern Warfare items players have earned or purchased. On November 13, 2020, to coincide with Cold War's release, operator characters from Cold War were added to Warzone's playable roster. Season 1 of Cold War content was released on December 16, 2020, which integrated Cold War's weapons and their associated cosmetic items into Warzone.

A second content integration was announced for Warzone by Activision and Sledgehammer Games, scheduled shortly after the release of Call of Duty: Vanguard. As with the Cold War integration, new items from Vanguard, including operator characters and weapons, would be added to Warzone while allowing players to retain items from Modern Warfare and Cold War. An early integration was included with the Cold War season 6 update in October 2021, which featured cosmetic blueprints for two Vanguard weapons added to Warzone as additional free items from the seasonal battle pass. The full integration was released on December 8, 2021, to coincide with the launch of Vanguard's season 1 content update.

Story 
Warzone's story is intertwined with the seasonal narratives of Modern Warfare, Black Ops Cold War and Vanguard. Verdansk is used as a common setting across various multiplayer maps in Modern Warfare, while Rebirth Island is inspired by locations and stories in previous Black Ops games. Caldera and Fortune's Keep complement Vanguard's seasonal story.

Modern Warfare 

In 2020, following an attack orchestrated by terrorists Khaled Al-Asad and Victor Zakhaev, the city of Verdansk is engulfed in a cloud of toxic gas. The Armistice, a joint faction consisting of Russian (Allegiance) and NATO (Coalition) operators, quickly disbands amidst the chaos of the attack, while the operators form smaller sub-factions as they fight one another for survival. The remaining Armistice leaders attempt to track down Zakhaev and learn of his plans. Following months of searching, Task Force 141, led by Captain John Price, eventually locates Zakhaev and stops him from launching a nuclear missile.

Several months later, in February 2021, a Soviet-era cargo ship, named Vodianoy, appears and crashes on the shores of Verdansk, long after its disappearance in 1984 during the transportation of a large supply of lethal gas, named Nova 6. The ship breaks in half, unleashing hordes of the undead into the wild. In the following weeks, the undead tread throughout the city, leaving behind contamination traces. Armistice deploys its forces to Verdansk and they attempt to contain the threat, but are largely unsuccessful in doing so. 

After two months of fighting, on April 21, 2021, a full evacuation of the city is ordered and Armistice launches a final attempt at eliminating the undead threat. Within 45 minutes of the operation's start, however, Verdansk is deemed to be a lost cause. In a last-ditch effort to stop the undead from spreading beyond the confines of the doomed city, Armistice Central Command launches a nuclear missile strike towards Verdansk, annihilating both the undead threat and the city in the process.

Black Ops Cold War 

In 1984, Perseus operative Vikhor "Stitch" Kuzmin rebuilds and recommissions Rebirth Island's facilities for production of the lethal Nova-6 gas. At some point, the cargo ship Vodianoy departs from the island, only to mysteriously disappear in the middle of the sea. Some time later, Stitch lures his nemesis, CIA agent Russell Adler, into a trap and captures him. The CIA conducts a search and rescue operation, and eventually tracks Adler from Laos to Verdansk, where Stitch holds him captive. A CIA squad led by Frank Woods rescues Adler in Verdansk, while Stitch continues to carry out his plan: to reactivate Project Nova, a numbers broadcast program once helmed by Nikita Dragovich, as well as to seize control of various brainwashed sleeper agents embedded in Verdansk.

The CIA eventually learns that Adler has been off-grid in Verdansk, potentially compromised due to the numbers program. Adler is apprehended and eventually cured of his brainwashing; at the same time, Stitch and other Perseus agents learn of several explosive charges placed around Verdansk by Adler, and fail to stop their detonation. Adler deploys to Verdansk, alongside Woods, Alex Mason and Jason Hudson to thwart Stitch's plan. They eventually find Stitch in the woods, where he reveals himself as the bearer of the Perseus mantle, while the previous holder had passed away from cancer in 1983, much to Adler's dismay. Stitch surrenders his life to Adler, while taunting him of his actions; a gunshot is heard as the scene fades to black.

Several days later, Adler, Mason, Hudson and Woods investigate a buried German WWII bunker in the ruins of Verdansk, where they meet Captain Carver Butcher, a retired Special Operations Executive agent who created the first spec-ops task force, Vanguard. Butcher then tells Adler and the others of his mission to hunt down remnants of the Nazi empire, which began in the Pacific.

Vanguard 

In December 1944, Butcher authorizes Operation Vulcan, a top-secret SOE mission to infiltrate Caldera Island and track down fleeing Axis soldiers and scientists. While nearing the island, accompanied by Task Force Trident, their plane is shot, forcing Trident to jump out while Butcher crashes near the beach. As the three Trident operators attempt to navigate the island, Butcher emerges from the crash and finds an entrance to a Nazi bunker near the beach. Intel from the bunker reveals that the Nazis were working on a chemical weapon, named "Nebula V". Some time later, Butcher travels to the Swiss Alps with Task Force Yeti, where the Nazis are keeping the Nebula V gas in a fortress. The task force storms the fortress, but is unable to stop the Nazi commander from unleashing the gas. Butcher and the task force barely manage to escape as the gas engulfs the fortress.

The Nazis begin to deploy Nebula V across the world, hitting major cities such as Paris and London, as well as Caldera. In March 1951, Butcher dispatches Task Force Harpy to Caldera to intercept a Nazi arms convoy, where they find a radio emitting a mysterious primal sound. Butcher laments that the release of Nebula V has awakened something powerful near Caldera. The island would eventually become a battleground between two gigantic monsters, the kaiju Godzilla and the gorilla Kong.

By 1976, the Task Forces under Butcher's command begin to take up mercenary work, in hopes of recovering Nazi gold and other sources of wealth. Butcher leads his own squad, Task Force Immortal, to investigate the crash site of a helicopter carrying a gold shipment, but is met with hostility from Vanguard squad leader Arthur Kingsley, who has formed his own mercenary team comprising members from other task forces.

Announcement and release 
Warzone was released on March 10, 2020, following a series of glitches and leaks in the preceding month. The existence of the game had been leaked a month prior by a post on Reddit, and a software glitch that same month briefly allowed players to view an early version of the battle map. On March 8, 2020, two days before release, YouTube streamer Chaos published an 11-minute video claiming to feature gameplay from the unreleased Warzone title. The video was removed, and on March 9, ‘‘Warzone’’ publisher, Activision, officially announced that the game would be released on March 10. On March 11, 2020, Activision announced that Warzone had been downloaded by six million people in the first 24 hours. On March 13, 2020, the official Call of Duty Twitter account announced that Warzone had crossed 15 million players earlier in the day

On April 10, 2020, Activision announced that Warzone had surpassed over 50 million downloads in its first month. In March 2022, Activision announced that they were developing a mobile version of Warzone.

Sequel 

On February 11, 2022, Activision announced that alongside 2022's Call of Duty: Modern Warfare II, developer Infinity Ward was also working on "a new Warzone experience" designed from the ground-up. On June 8, 2022, Activision officially announced Call of Duty: Warzone 2.0, it was released shortly after Modern Warfare II,  on November 16, 2022.

Reception

Call of Duty: Warzone received "generally favorable reviews" from critics across all platforms, according to review aggregator Metacritic.

In its 7/10 review, GameSpot praised the variety and size of the maps, and wrote: "Warzone is a great sophomore attempt at a battle royale from Call of Duty, which finally manages to carve out its own identity with interesting spins on the existing formula. Its subversion of death and the nail-biting Gulag duels give you more ways to stay in a match, while also forcing you to be aware of your surroundings even after wiping a rival squad." IGN also gave the game 7/10, summarizing with: "Call of Duty: Warzones beta remains thoroughly enjoyable even in spite of the serious concessions to depth made in the name of instant gratification."

The game has been heavily criticized for its large download size, which culminated in October 2020 with the game widely reported to no longer fit on a 250GB SSD.

, the game has more than  players worldwide.

It was nominated for Best Multiplayer and Best Ongoing at The Game Awards 2020.

Notes

References

External links 
 

2020 video games
Activision games
Battle royale games
Warzone
First-person shooters
PlayStation 4 games
PlayStation 5 games
Video games set in 1984
Video games set in a fictional country
Video games set in Eastern Europe
Video games set in Kazakhstan
Video games set in Uzbekistan
Video games set in the Soviet Union
Video games set in Oceania
Windows games
Xbox One games
Xbox Series X and Series S games
Free-to-play video games
Video games with cross-platform play
Video games containing battle passes
Infinity Ward games
Video games developed in the United States
Online-only games